Ali Hassan Afif Yahya (born 20 January 1988) is a Qatari footballer. He currently plays as a left-back for Al-Duhail.

Personal
Afif has six siblings. His father, Hassan Afif, is of Somali descent and was born in Moshi, Tanzania. His father previously played for Simba in Tanzania and Horseed in Somalia before relocating to Qatar and playing for Al Ittihad. He was later naturalized. After retiring, he managed Al Gharafa from 1986 till 1987 and Al Markhiya from 2001 till 2003 and 2006 till 2007. His mother, Fayza, comes from Yemen.

He has a brother, Akram Afif, who is also a member of Qatar's football team. He currently plays for Al Sadd.

International career

International goals
Scores and results list Qatar's goal tally first.

Honours

Club
Al-Sadd
Qatar Stars League: 2003–04, 2005–06, 2006–07
Qatar Emir Cup: 2005, 2007
Qatar Cup: 2006, 2007, 2008
Qatari Sheikh Jassim Cup: 2006
Qatari Stars Cup: 2010
AFC Champions League: 2011
FIFA Club World Cup bronze medalist: 2011

Al-Duhail
Qatar Stars League: 2011–12, 2013–14, 2014–15, 2016–17, 2017–18
Qatar Emir Cup: 2016, 2018, 2019
Qatar Cup: 2013, 2015, 2018
Qatari Sheikh Jassim Cup: 2015, 2016

International
Qatar
AFC Asian Cup: 2019

References

External links

كــــووورة قطـــريــــة تلتقي بالنجــمـ الواعــد علي حســن العــفيــفــ (Interview) 

1988 births
Living people
Qatari footballers
Naturalised citizens of Qatar
Qatar international footballers
Al-Markhiya SC players
Al Sadd SC players
Lekhwiya SC players
Al-Duhail SC players
2007 AFC Asian Cup players
2011 AFC Asian Cup players
2019 AFC Asian Cup players
Qatar Stars League players
Qatari people of Yemeni descent
Qatari people of Tanzanian descent
Qatari people of Somali descent
Association football midfielders
Association football forwards
AFC Asian Cup-winning players
Qatar youth international footballers